Give me five is a gesture that could refer to a high five or low five

Give me five or Gimme five may also refer to:

TV and online
Give Me Five!, a Chicago Bulls video
Gimme 5 (TV series) (1992-1994), a British children's television programme

Music
Give Me Five, an album by Buck Trent
Gimme Five, an album by The Killjoys

"Give Me Five!" (2012), a music single by the Japanese girl idol group AKB48
Gimme 5 (group), a Filipino boy group